In mathematical analysis, the Hardy–Littlewood Tauberian theorem is a Tauberian theorem relating the asymptotics of the partial sums of a series with the asymptotics of its Abel summation.  In this form, the theorem asserts that if, as y ↓ 0, the non-negative sequence an is such that there is an asymptotic equivalence

then there is also an asymptotic equivalence

as n → ∞.  The integral formulation of the theorem relates in an analogous manner the asymptotics of the cumulative distribution function of a function with the asymptotics of its Laplace transform.

The theorem was proved in 1914 by G. H. Hardy and J. E. Littlewood. In 1930, Jovan Karamata gave a new and much simpler proof.

Statement of the theorem

Series formulation
This formulation is from Titchmarsh. Suppose an ≥ 0 for all n, and as x ↑ 1 we have

Then as n goes to ∞ we have

The theorem is sometimes quoted in equivalent forms, where instead of requiring an ≥ 0, we require an = O(1), or we require an ≥ −K for some constant K. The theorem is sometimes quoted in another equivalent formulation (through the change of variable x = 1/ey ). If, as y ↓ 0,

then

Integral formulation
The following more general formulation is from Feller. Consider a real-valued function F : [0,∞) → R of bounded variation.  The Laplace–Stieltjes transform of F is defined by the Stieltjes integral

The theorem relates the asymptotics of ω with those of F in the following way.  If ρ is a non-negative real number, then the following statements are equivalent

Here Γ denotes the Gamma function. One obtains the theorem for series as a special case by taking ρ = 1 and F(t) to be a piecewise constant function with value  between t = n and t = n + 1.

A slight improvement is possible. According to the definition of a slowly varying function, L(x) is slow varying at infinity iff

for every positive t.  Let L be a function slowly varying at infinity and ρ a non-negative real number. Then the following statements are equivalent

Karamata's proof

 found a short proof of the theorem by considering the functions g such that

An easy calculation shows that all monomials g(x) = xk have this property, and therefore so do all polynomials g. This can be extended to a function g with simple (step) discontinuities by approximating it by polynomials from above and below (using the Weierstrass approximation theorem and a little extra fudging) and using the fact that the coefficients an are positive. In particular the function given by g(t) = 1/t if 1/e < t < 1 and 0 otherwise has this property. But then for x = e−1/N the sum Σanxng(xn) is a0 + ... + aN, and the integral of g is 1, from which the Hardy–Littlewood theorem follows immediately.

Examples

Non-positive coefficients

The theorem can fail without the condition that the coefficients are non-negative. For example, the function

is asymptotic to 1/4(1–x) as x tends to 1, but the partial sums of its coefficients are 1, 0, 2, 0, 3, 0, 4, ... and are not asymptotic to any linear function.

Littlewood's extension of Tauber's theorem

In 1911 Littlewood proved an extension of Tauber's converse of Abel's theorem. Littlewood showed the following: If an = O(1/n), and as x ↑ 1 we have 

then

This came historically before the Hardy–Littlewood Tauberian theorem, but can be proved as a simple application of it.

Prime number theorem
In 1915 Hardy and Littlewood developed a proof of the prime number theorem based on their Tauberian theorem; they proved

where Λ is the von Mangoldt function, and then conclude

an equivalent form of the prime number theorem.
Littlewood developed a simpler proof, still based on this Tauberian theorem, in 1971.

Notes

External links
 
 

Tauberian theorems